In functional analysis, a branch of mathematics, Michael selection theorem is a selection theorem named after Ernest Michael. In its most popular form, it states the following:

 Let X be a paracompact space and Y a Banach space. 
Let  be a lower hemicontinuous set-valued function with nonempty convex closed values. 
Then there exists a continuous selection  of F.

 Conversely, if any lower semicontinuous multimap from topological space X to a Banach space, with nonempty convex closed values, admits a continuous selection, then X is paracompact. This provides another characterization for paracompactness.

Examples

A function that satisfies all requirements 
The function: , shown by the grey area in the figure at the right, is a set-valued function from the real interval [0,1] to itself.

A function that does not satisfy lower hemicontinuity 
The function

is a set-valued function from the real interval [0,1] to itself. It has nonempty convex closed values. However, it is not lower hemicontinuous at 0.5. Indeed, Michael's theorem does not apply and the function does not have a continuous selection: any selection at 0.5 is necessarily discontinuous.

Applications 

Michael selection theorem can be applied to show that the differential inclusion

has a C1 solution when F is lower semi-continuous and F(t, x) is a nonempty closed and convex set for all (t, x). When F is single valued, this is the classic Peano existence theorem.

Generalizations 

A theorem due to Deutsch and Kenderov generalizes Michel selection theorem to an equivalence relating approximate selections to almost lower hemicontinuity, where  is said to be almost lower hemicontinuous if at each , all neighborhoods  of  there exists a neighborhood  of  such that 

In a note Xu proved that Deutsch–Kenderov theorem is also valid if  is a locally convex topological vector space.

See also 
 Zero-dimensional Michael selection theorem
Selection theorem

References

Further reading 
 
 
 
 
 
  
 
 

Theory of continuous functions
Properties of topological spaces
Theorems in functional analysis
Compactness theorems